Group C of the 2013 FIBA Asia Championship took place from 1 to 3 August 2011. This is the preliminary round of the 2013 FIBA Asia Championship, with the three teams with the best record (Iran, Korea, China) advancing to 2013 FIBA Asia Championship Group F. Malaysia, the last placed team, was relegated to the 13th–15th classification round.

All games were played at the Mall of Asia Arena in Pasay, Philippines.

Summary
Iran opened the 2013 championship with an unprecedented 90-point win against Malaysia. In a close match between China and Korea, the match was tied with 30 seconds left when Cho Sung-min made his free throws to give the Koreans a two-point lead. Zhou Peng missed a shot for China, and Cho made both of his free throws off an intentional foul. The Koreans held on for the win when Chinese missed three more shots. On the next day, the Chinese scored a 91-point win against Malaysia, thereby eliminating them. Iran maintained a healthy lead against Korea in the second half, never relinquishing it to qualify for the next round. On the final day, the Malaysians had a better offensive output, but were still beaten by Korea, and Iran never relinquished the lead against China to win the group.

Standings

|}

All times are local (UTC+8).

August 1

Iran vs. Malaysia

|-
|4 ||align=left|Mohammad Jamshidi || 25 || 6/10 || 60 || 6/8 || 75 || 0/0 || 0 || 1 || 2 || 3 || 4 || 0 || 3 || 2 || 0 || 12
|-
|5 ||align=left|Aren Davoudi || 13 || 0/2 || 0 || 0/0 || 0 || 2/2 || 100 || 0 || 2 || 2 || 3 || 2 || 0 || 1 || 0 || 2
|-
|6 ||align=left|Javad Davari || 16 || 1/5 || 20 || 0/3 || 0 || 5/6 || 83.3 || 0 || 0 || 0 || 1 || 2 || 0 || 0 || 0 || 8
|-
|7 ||align=left|Mehdi Kamrani || 11 || 5/7 || 71.4 || 3/4 || 75 || 0/1 || 0 || 0 || 2 || 2 || 2 || 0 || 0 || 2 || 0 || 12
|-
|8 ||align=left|Saman Veisi || 19 || 4/5 || 80 || 4/5 || 80 || 1/2 || 50 || 0 || 6 || 6 || 3 || 0 || 0 || 0 || 1 || 9
|-
|9 ||align=left|Oshin Sahakian || 18 || 5/7 || 71.4 || 5/5 || 100 || 0/2 || 0 || 1 || 4 || 5 || 3 || 1 || 2 || 0 || 0 || 10
|-
|10 ||align=left|Hamed Afagh || 20 || 3/10 || 30 || 2/5 || 40 || 0/0 || 0 || 0 || 2 || 2 || 4 || 2 || 0 || 0 || 0 || 7
|-
|11 ||align=left|Hamed Sohrabnejad || 16 || 2/5 || 40 || 2/5 || 40 || 0/0 || 0 ||  1 || 4 || 5 || 1 || 1 || 1 || 0 || 0 || 4
|-
|12 ||align=left|Asghar Kardoust || 14 || 7/8 || 87.5 || 7/8 || 87.5 || 1/2 || 50 || 2 || 3 || 5 || 2 || 0 || 2 || 0 || 0 || 15
|-
|13 ||align=left|Rouzbeh Arghavan || 20 || 2/4 || 50 || 2/4 || 50 || 0/1 || 0 || 2 || 4 || 6 || 2 || 1 || 0 || 0 || 0 || 4
|-
|14 ||align=left|Samad Nikkhah Bahrami || 15 || 4/5 || 80 || 3/4 || 75 || 2/3 || 66.7 || 2 || 1 || 3 || 4 || 1 || 2 || 2 || 1 || 11
|-
|15 ||align=left|Hamed Haddadi || 13 || 8/9 || 88.9 || 8/9 || 88.9 || 5/5 || 100 || 3 || 5 || 8 || 2 || 0 || 0 || 0 || 1 || 21
|-
|align=left colspan=2|Totals || 200 || 47/77 || 61 || 42/60 || 70 || 16/24 || 66.7 || 12 || 36 || 48 || 31 || 10 || 11 || 7 || 3 || 115
|}

|-
|4 ||align=left|Eng Heng Soo || 22 || 1/3 || 33.3 || 1/3 || 33.3 || 0/0 || 0 || 0 || 4 || 4 || 0 || 2 || 5 || 0 || 0 || 2
|-
|5 ||align=left|Sing Tee Ng || 6 || 0/4 || 0 || 0/3 || 0 || 0/0 || 0 || 0 || 0 || 0 || 0 || 1 || 0 || 1 || 0 || 0
|-
|6 ||align=left|Wee Seng Wong || 10 || 1/5 || 20 || 0/1 || 0 || 0/0 || 0 || 0 || 0 || 1 || 1 || 0 || 0 || 0 || 0 ||3
|-00
|7 ||align=left|Wei Hong Choo || 18 || 0/5 || 0 || 0/1 || 0 || 0/0 || 0 || 0 || 3 || 3 || 1 || 2 || 3 || 0 || 0 || 0
|-
|8 ||align=left|Ban Sin Ooi || 24 || 0/6 || 0/2 || 0 || 2/2 || 100 || 0 || 2 || 2 || 0 || 2 || 5 || 1 || 0 || 0 || 2
|-
|9 ||align=left|Wen Keong Tong || 21 || 1/4 || 25 || 0/1 || 0 || 0/0 || 0 || 0 || 2 || 2 || 1 || 0 || 3 || 0 || 0 || 3
|-
|10 ||align=left|Hong Hoong Gan || 22 || 4/6 || 66.7 || 1/3 || 33.3 || 0/0 || 0 || 1 || 0 || 1 || 0 || 0 || 5 || 0 || 0 || 11
|-
|11 ||align=left|Tian Yuan Kuek || 28 || 1/6 || 16.7 || 1/4 || 25 || 0/0 || 0 || 0 || 5 || 5 || 0 || 4 || 7 || 0 || 0 || 2
|-
|13 ||align=left|Chin Yong Wong || 29 || 0/4 || 0 || 0/3 || 0 || 0/0 || 0 || 0 || 2 || 2 || 2 || 4 || 4 || 0 || 0 || 0
|-
|14 ||align=left|Lok Seng Mak || 11 || 1/2 || 50 || 1/2 || 50 || 0/0 || 0 || 0 || 2 || 2 || 1 || 0 || 1 || 0 || 0 || 2
|-
|15 ||align=left|Min Joe Foong || 8 || 0/2 || 0 || 0/2 || 0 || 0/0 || 0 || 0 || 1 || 1 || 0 || 5 || 1 || 0 || 1 || 0
|-
|align=left colspan=2|Totals || 200 || 9/47 || 19.1 || 4/25 || 16 || 2/2 || 100 || 2 || 21 || 23 || 6 || 21 || 35 || 2 || 1 || 25
|}

China vs. Korea

|-
|4 ||align=left|Guo Ailun || 4 || 1/1 || 100 || 1/1 || 100 || 0/0 || 0 || 0 || 1 || 1 || 0 || 1 || 1 || 0 || 0 || 2
|-
|5 ||align=left|Liu Xiaoyu || 11 || 3/3 || 100 || 3/3 || 100 || 0/1 || 0 || 1 || 2 || 3 || 0 || 4 || 1 || 0 || 0 || 6
|-
|6 ||align=left|Chen Jianghua || 25 || 1/5 || 20 || 1/3 || 33.3 || 0/2 || 0 || 0 || 1 || 1 || 1 || 4 || 1 || 0 || 0 || 2
|-
|7 ||align=left|Wang Shipeng || 25 || 0/5 || 0 || 0/1 || 0 || 1/2 || 50 || 1 || 1 || 2 || 2 || 3 || 5 || 0 || 0 || 1
|-
|8 ||align=left|Zhu Fangyu || 18 || 0/5 || 0 || 0/2 || 0 || 4/4 || 100 || 1 || 2 || 3 || 1 || 3 || 0 || 0 || 0 || 4
|-
|9 ||align=left|Sun Yue || 27 || 1/5 || 20 || 1/2 || 50 || 0/0 || 0 || 0 || 1 || 1 || 3 || 1 || 1 || 2 || 1 || 2
|-
|10 ||align=left|Li Xiaoxu || 7 || 0/1 || 0 || 0/1 || 0 || 0/0 || 0 || 0 || 1 || 1 || 1 || 2 || 0 || 0 || 0 || 0
|-
|11 ||align=left|Yi Jianlian || 30 || 7/14 || 50 || 7/13 || 53.8 || 9/11 || 81.8 || 4 || 6 || 10 || 0 || 3 || 5 || 1 || 1 || 23
|-
|12 ||align=left|Zhang Bo || 9 || 1/2 || 50 || 1/2 || 50 || 0/0 || 0 || 0 || 0 || 0 || 0 || 4 || 0 || 0 || 0 || 2
|-
|13 ||align=left|Wang Zhelin || 18 || 2/3 || 66.7 || 2/3 || 66.7 || 1/4 || 25 || 6 || 4 || 10 || 0 || 1 || 2 || 1 || 0 || 5
|-
|14 ||align=left|Wang Zhizhi || 3 || 2/2 || 100 || 2/2 || 100 || 0/0 || 0 || 0 || 0 || 0 || 0 || 0 || 1 || 0 || 0 || 4
|-
|15 ||align=left|Zhou Peng || 22 || 3/9 || 33.3 || 3/8 || 37.5 || 2/2 || 100 || 0 || 2 || 2 || 2 || 0 || 0 || 0 || 0 || 8
|-
|align=left colspan=2|Totals || 200 || 21/55 || 38.2 || 21/41 || 51.2 || 17/26 || 65.4 || 16 || 22 || 38 || 10 || 26 || 18 || 4 || 2 || 59
|}

|-
|4 ||align=left|Kim Min-Goo || 5 || 0/0 || 0/0 || 0 || 0/0 || 0 || 0 || 0 || 0 || 0 || 1 || 1 || 0 || 0 || 0 || 0
|-
|5 ||align=left|Kim Sun-Hyung || 17 || 3/6 || 50 || 3/5 || 60 || 3/5 || 60 || 0 || 2 || 2 || 1 || 2 || 2 || 0 || 0 || 3
|-
|6 ||align=left|Yang Dong-Geun || 27 || 1/4 || 25 || 0/2 || 0 || 8/8 || 100 || 1 || 3 || 4 || 4 || 2 || 2 || 0 || 0 || 11
|-00
|7 ||align=left|Kim Tae-Sul || 13 || 0/3 || 0 || 0/2 || 0 || 3/4 || 75 || 1 || 2 || 3 || 1 || 1 || 2 || 0 || 0 || 3
|-
|8 ||align=left|Moon Seong-Gon || 2 || 1/2 || 50 || 1/2 || 50 || 0/2 || 0 || 1 || 1 || 2 || 0 || 1 || 0 || 0 || 0 || 2
|-
|9 ||align=left|Yun Ho-Young || 13 || 0/1 || 0 || 0/1 || 0 || 0/0 || 0 || 0 || 3 || 3 || 1 || 3 || 1 || 0 || 0 || 0
|-
|10 ||align=left|Cho Sung-Min || 32 || 3/6 || 50 || 3/5 || 60 || 6/6 || 100 || 0 || 4 || 4 || 2 || 1 || 3 || 0 || 0 || 12
|-
|11 ||align=left|Kim Joo-Sung || 19 || 6/7 || 85.7 || 6/6 || 100 || 3/3 || 100 || 2 || 1 || 3 || 1 || 3 || 1 || 1 || 0 || 15
|-
|12 ||align=left|Kim Jong-Kyu || 26 || 1/4 || 25 || 1/4 || 25 || 0/0 || 0 || 0 || 1 || 1 || 0 || 0 || 0 || 0 || 0 || 2
|-
|13 ||align=left|Choi Jun-Yong || 11 || 1/4 || 25 || 1/2 || 50 || 0/0 || 0 || 0 || 1 || 1 || 0 || 0 || 0 || 1 || 1 || 2
|-
|14 ||align=left|Lee Seung-Jun || 21 || 3/6 || 50 || 3/6 || 50 || 0/0 || 0 || 1 || 0 || 1 || 1 || 4 || 2 || 1 || 0 || 6
|-
|15 ||align=left|Lee Jong-Hyun || 14 || 0/3 || 0 || 0/3 || 0 || 1/2 || 50 || 1 || 2 || 3 || 2 || 0 || 1 || 0 || 0 || 1
|-
|align=left colspan=2|Totals || 200 || 19/46 || 41.3 || 18/38 || 47.4 || 24/30 || 80 || 7 || 21 || 28 || 14 || 22 || 16 || 4 || 1 || 63
|}

August 2

China vs. Malaysia

|-
|4 ||align=left|Guo Ailun || 18|| 7/8|| 87.5|| 5/5|| 100|| 0/0|| 0|| ♙|| 1|| 4|| 2|| 1|| 1|| 4|| 0||16
|-
|5 ||align=left|Liu Xiaoyu || 22|| 2/6|| 33.3|| 1/4|| 25|| 2/2|| 100|| ♙|| 4|| 5|| 3|| 0|| 0|| 3|| 0||7
|-
|6 ||align=left|Chen Jianghua || 10|| 0/3|| 0|| 0/1|| 0|| 0/0|| 0|| ♙|| 0|| 2|| 3|| 1|| 0|| 0|| 0||0
|-
|7 ||align=left|Wang Shipeng || 20|| 1/3|| 33|| 0/0|| 0|| 2/3|| 66.7|| 0|| 2|| 2|| 3|| 1|| 0|| 0|| 0||5
|-
|8 ||align=left|Zhu Fangyu || 19|| 6/9|| 66.7|| 2/2|| 100|| 0/0|| 0|| ♙|| 0|| 1|| 5|| 1|| 1|| 0|| 0||16
|-
|9 ||align=left|Sun Yue || 20|| 2/6|| 33.3|| 0/1|| 0|| 0/0|| 0|| 0|| 4|| 4|| 2|| 0|| 0|| 0|| 0||6
|-
|10 ||align=left|Li Xiaoxu || 24|| 4/6|| 66.7|| 4/6|| 66.7|| 0/0|| 0|| 2|| 5|| 7|| 7|| 2|| 1|| 0|| 0||8
|-
|11 ||align=left|Yi Jianlian ||colspan=16 align=left|Did not play
|-
|12 ||align=left|Zhang Bo || 18|| 3/8|| 37.5|| 2/6|| 33.3|| 1/2|| 50|| 0|| 0|| 0|| 0|| 3|| 0|| 0|| 0||8
|-
|13 ||align=left|Wang Zhelin || 23|| 9/12|| 75|| 9/12|| 75|| 3/7|| 42.9|| 5|| 3|| 8|| 0|| 1|| 0|| 0|| 2||21
|-
|14 ||align=left|Wang Zhizhi || 18|| 8/11|| 72.7|| 7/9|| 77.8|| 0/0|| 0|| 1|| 2|| 3|| 5|| 0|| 0|| 0|| 1||17
|-
|15 ||align=left|Zhou Peng || 10|| 3/4|| 75|| 3/4|| 75|| 3/5|| 60|| 1|| 4|| 5|| 0|| 0|| 0|| 0|| 0||9
|-
|align=left colspan=2|Totals || 200|| 45/76|| 59.2|| 33/50|| 66|| 11/19|| 57.9|| 17|| 26|| 43|| 27|| 9|| 4|| 7|| 3|| 113
|}

|-
|4 ||align=left|Eng Heng Soo ||  14||  0/2||  0||  0/2||  0||  0/0||  0||  1||  1||  2||  1||  2||  2||  0||  0|| 0
|-
|5 ||align=left|Sing Tee Ng ||  10||  0/2||  0||  0/2||  0||  0/0||  0||  0||  0||  0||  0||  2||  0||  0|| 0 || 0
|-
|6 ||align=left|Wee Seng Wong ||  11||  0/2||  0||  0/1||  0||  0/0||  0||  0||  1||  1||  0||  1||  3||  0||  0|| 0
|- 00
|7 ||align=left|Wei Hong Choo ||  16||  0/4||  0||  0/3||  0||  0/0||  0||  0||  1||  1||  0||  0||  1||  0|| 0 || 0
|-
|8 ||align=left|Ban Sin Ooi ||  27||  2/9||  22.2||  0/2||  0||  3/4||  75||  0||  2||  4||  1||  1||  9||  0||  0|| 9
|-
|9 ||align=left|Wen Keong Tong ||  26||  1/4||  25||  1/3||  33.3||  0/0||  0||  0||  1||  1||  1||  3||  4||  0||  0|| 2
|-
|10 ||align=left|Hong Hoong Gan ||  20||  1/4||  25||  0/2||  0||  0/0||  0||  1||  3||  4||  0||  2||  2||  0||  0|| 3
|-
|11 ||align=left|Tian Yuan Kuek ||  24||  1/8||  12.5||  1/5||  20||  0/0||  0||  0||  3||  3||  0||  4||  2||  0||  0|| 2
|-
|13 ||align=left|Chin Yong Wong ||  21||  1/5||  20||  1/4||  25||  0/0||  0||  2||  2||  4||  0||  1||  6||  1||  0|| 2
|-
|14 ||align=left|Lok Seng Mak ||  12||  0/0||  0||  0/0||  0||  0/0||  0||  0||  2||  2||  0||  0||  2||  0||  0|| 0
|-
|15 ||align=left|Min Joe Foong ||  19||  2/4||  50||  2/4||  50||  0/0||  0||  1||  2||  3||  0||  1||  2||  0||  0|| 4
|-
|align=left colspan=2|Totals || 200|| 8/44|| 18.2|| 5/27|| 18.5|| 3/4|| 75|| 7|| 21|| 28|| 3|| 17|| 33|| 1|| 0|| 22
|}

Korea vs. Iran

|-
|4 ||align=left|Kim Min-Goo ||  21||  4/10||  40||  1/2||  50||  0/0||  0||  3||  4||  7||  1||  3||  0||  2||  0|| 11
|-
|5 ||align=left|Kim Sun-Hyung ||  25||  3/11||  27.3||  3/8||  37.5||  0/0||  0||  1||  2||  3||  2||  0||  2||  0||  0|| 6
|-
|6 ||align=left|Yang Dong-Geun ||  15||  1/4||  25||  1/2||  50||  0/0||  0||  0||  0||  0||  0||  2||  1||  0||  0|| 2
|-00
|7 ||align=left|Kim Tae-Sul ||  8||  0/0||  0||  0/0||  0||  0/0||  0||  0||  0||  0||  2||  0||  1||  0||  0|| 0
|-
|8 ||align=left|Moon Seong-Gon ||  1||  0/1||  0||  0/0||  0||  0/0||  0||  0||  0||  0||  0||  0||  0||  0||  0|| 0
|-
|9 ||align=left|Yun Ho-Young ||  10||  0/0||  0||  0/0||  0||  1/2||  50||  0||  1||  1||  1||  2||  1||  0||  0|| 1
|-
|10 ||align=left|Cho Sung-Min ||  31||  3/8||  37.5||  1/3||  33.3||  7/8||  87.5||  2||  2||  4||  2||  3||  0||  1||  0|| 15
|-
|11 ||align=left|Kim Joo-Sung ||  20||  2/7||  28.6||  2/7||  28.6||  1/2||  50||  0||  1||  1||  3||  5||  0||  0||  1|| 5
|-
|12 ||align=left|Kim Jong-Kyu ||  25||  5/8||  67.5||  5/8||  67.5||  1/2||  50||  2||  1||  3||  0||  2||  0||  0||  0|| 11
|-
|13 ||align=left|Choi Jun-Yong ||  11||  0/2||  0||  0/2||  0||  2/3||  66.7||  0||  2||  2||  1||  0||  1||  0||  1|| 2
|-
|14 ||align=left|Lee Seung-Jun ||  16||  1/5||  20||  0/2||  0||  1/2||  50||  1||  5||  6||  0||  2||  0||  0||  2|| 4
|-
|15 ||align=left|Lee Jong-Hyun ||  19||  3/6||  50||  3/6||  50||  2/2||  100||  2||  2||  4||  1||  4||  1||  1||  1|| 8
|-
|align=left colspan=2|Totals || 200|| 22/62|| 35.5|| 16/40|| 40|| 15/21|| 71.4|| 15|| 22|| 37|| 13|| 23|| 7|| 4|| 5||65
|}

|-
|4 ||align=left|Mohammad Jamshidi || 12||  1/2|| 50||  0/0|| 0||  0/0|| 0|| 0|| 1|| 1|| 0|| 2|| 0|| 0|| 0|| 3
|-
|5 ||align=left|Aren Davoudi || 15||  0/1|| 0||  0/0|| 0||  2/2|| 100|| 0|| 2|| 2|| 0|| 2|| 0|| 0|| 0|| 2
|-
|6 ||align=left|Javad Davari || 4||  0/1|| 0||  0/0|| 0||  0/0|| 0|| 0|| 0|| 0|| 0|| 1|| 2|| 0|| 0|| 0
|-
|7 ||align=left|Mehdi Kamrani || 31||  2/6|| 33.3||  2/5|| 40||  1/4|| 25|| 1|| 3|| 4|| 9|| 3|| 1|| 0|| 3|| 5
|-
|8 ||align=left|Saman Veisi || 5||  0/1|| 0||  0/1|| 0||  0/0|| 0|| 1|| 0|| 1|| 0|| 0|| 0|| 0|| 0|| 0
|-
|9 ||align=left|Oshin Sahakian || 24||  1/5|| 20||  1/5|| 20||  2/2|| 100|| 3|| 2|| 5|| 0|| 2|| 1|| 0|| 0|| 4
|-
|10 ||align=left|Hamed Afagh || 17||  1/4|| 25||  1/2|| 50||  0/0|| 0|| 2|| 1|| 3|| 1|| 5|| 0|| 2|| 0|| 2
|-
|11 ||align=left|Hamed Sohrabnejad ||colspan=16 align=left|Did not play
|-
|12 ||align=left|Asghar Kardoust || 8||  1/2|| 50||  1/2|| 50||  2/3|| 66.7|| 0|| 0|| 0|| 0|| 0|| 0|| 0|| 1|| 4
|-
|13 ||align=left|Rouzbeh Arghavan || 17||  1/5|| 20||  1/4|| 25||  1/2|| 50|| 4|| 2|| 6|| 0|| 4|| 3|| 0|| 0|| 3
|-
|14 ||align=left|Samad Nikkhah Bahrami || 39||  9/21|| 42.9||  9/17|| 52.9||  5/5|| 100|| 1|| 6|| 7|| 4|| 2|| 0|| 1|| 1|| 23
|-
|15 ||align=left|Hamed Haddadi || 30||  12/19|| 63.2||  12/19|| 63.2||  6/12|| 50|| 5|| 8|| 13|| 1|| 2|| 0|| 0|| 1|| 30
|-
|align=left colspan=2|Totals || 200|| 28/67|| 41.8|| 27/55|| 49.1|| 19/30|| 63.3|| 21|| 26|| 47|| 15|| 23|| 8|| 3|| 6||76
|}

August 3

Malaysia vs. Korea

|-
|4 ||align=left|Eng Heng Soo ||  20||  1/3||  33.3||  0/0||  0||  2/2||  100||  0||  1||  1||  2||  4||  0||  0||  0|| 5
|-
|5 ||align=left|Sing Tee Ng ||  16||  0/1||  0||  0/0||  0||  2/2||  100||  0||  2||  2||  0||  1||  0||  1||  0|| 2
|-
|6 ||align=left|Wee Seng Wong ||  12||  0/1||  0||  0/1||  0||  0/0||  0||  0||  3||  3||  1||  0||  2||  0||  0|| 0
|-00
|7 ||align=left|Wei Hong Choo ||  9||  1/4||  25||  1/1||  100||  1/2||  50||  1||  1||  2||  0||  2||  2||  0||  0|| 3
|-
|8 ||align=left|Ban Sin Ooi ||  27||  1/11||  9.1||  0/7||  0||  2/2||  100||  3||  3||  6||  2||  3||  5||  0||  0|| 5
|-
|9 ||align=left|Wen Keong Tong ||  17||  0/1||  0||  0/1||  0||  0/0||  0||  0||  2||  2||  2||  0||  2||  1||  0|| 0
|-
|10 ||align=left|Hong Hoong Gan ||  29||  4/8||  50||  2/6||  33.3||  0/0||  0||  0||  3||  3||  3||  2||  3||  1||  0|| 10
|-
|11 ||align=left|Tian Yuan Kuek ||  27||  10/15||  66.7||  5/6||  83.3||  0/0||  0||  0||  1||  1||  2||  5||  4||  0||  0|| 25
|-
|13 ||align=left|Chin Yong Wong ||  21||  2/6||  33.3||  2/5||  40||  0/0||  0||  0||  1||  1||  3||  2||  1||  1||  0|| 4
|-
|14 ||align=left|Lok Seng Mak ||  1||  0/0||  0||  0/0||  0||  0/0||  0||  2||  0||  2||  0||  0||  0||  0||  0|| 0
|-
|15 ||align=left|Min Joe Foong ||  20||  2/6||  33.3||  2/5||  40||  0/0||  0||  1||  1||  2||  0||  2||  1||  1||  0 || 4
|-
|align=left colspan=2|Totals || 200|| 21/56|| 37.5|| 12/32|| 37.5|| 7/8|| 87.5|| 7|| 19|| 26|| 15|| 21|| 20|| 5|| 0||58
|}

|-
|4 ||align=left|Kim Min-Goo ||  15||  2/7||  28.6||  0/0||  0||  0/0||  0||  1||  2||  3||  2||  1||  2||  0||  0|| 6
|-
|5 ||align=left|Kim Sun-Hyung ||  20||  2/8||  25||  2/5||  40||  0/0||  0||  1||  2||  3||  3||  0||  1||  0||  0|| 4
|-
|6 ||align=left|Yang Dong-Geun ||  20||  0/3||  0||  0/1||  0||  0/0||  0||  2||  2||  4||  6||  1||  0||  1||  0|| 0
|-00
|7 ||align=left|Kim Tae-Sul ||  20||  1/2||  50||  1/1||  100||  1/2||  50||  2||  2||  4||  4||  2||  1||  1||  0|| 3
|-
|8 ||align=left|Moon Seong-Gon ||  10||  4/7||  57.1||  2/2||  100||  0/0||  0||  0||  0||  0||  1||  3||  1||  0||  0|| 10
|-
|9 ||align=left|Yun Ho-Young ||  10||  2/2||  100||  1/1||  100||  0/0||  0||  0||  3||  3||  1||  0||  2||  0||  0|| 5
|-
|10 ||align=left|Cho Sung-Min ||  20||  4/9||  44.4||  3/6||  50||  2/2||  100||  0||  0||  0||  1||  2||  0||  1||  0|| 11
|-
|11 ||align=left|Kim Joo-Sung ||  20||  2/3||  66.7||  2/3||  66.7||  3/4||  75||  1||  2||  3||  2||  0||  2||  1||  0|| 7
|-
|12 ||align=left|Kim Jong-Kyu ||  19||  2/5||  40||  2/5||  40||  0/0||  0||  1||  2||  3||  2||  5||  3||  0||  0|| 4
|-
|13 ||align=left|Choi Jun-Yong ||  7||  0/6||  0||  0/3||  0||  0/2||  0||  1||  1||  2||  0||  0||  0||  0||  0|| 0
|-
|14 ||align=left|Lee Seung-Jun ||  20||  8/8||  100||  8/8||  100||  2/4||  50||  3||  6||  9||  1||  3||  5||  0||  0|| 18
|-
|15 ||align=left|Lee Jong-Hyun ||  21||  4/5||  80||  4/5||  80||  4/7||  57.1||  5||  4||  9||  3||  0||  2||  1||  3|| 12
|-
|align=left colspan=2|Totals || 200|| 31/65|| 47.7|| 25/40|| 62.5|| 12/21|| 57.1|| 17|| 26|| 43|| 26|| 17|| 19|| 5|| 3||80
|}

Iran vs. China

|-
|4 ||align=left|Mohammad Jamshidi || 7||  0/4|| 0||  0/2|| 0||  0/0|| 0|| 0|| 1|| 1|| 1|| 2|| 0|| 0|| 0|| 0
|-
|5 ||align=left|Aren Davoudi || 15||  0/1|| 0||  0/0|| 0||  3/4|| 75|| 0|| 3|| 4|| 3|| 3|| 1|| 1|| 0|| 3
|-
|6 ||align=left|Javad Davari || 10||  0/2|| 0||  0/1|| 0||  0/0|| 0|| 1|| 1|| 2|| 0|| 2|| 2|| 1|| 0|| 0
|-
|7 ||align=left|Mehdi Kamrani || 25||  1/3|| 33.3||  1/1|| 100||  1/1|| 100|| 1|| 1|| 2|| 3|| 3|| 2|| 4|| 0|| 3
|-
|8 ||align=left|Saman Veisi || 4||  1/2|| 50||  1/1|| 100||  0/0|| 0|| 1|| 0|| 1|| 0|| 0|| 0|| 0|| 0|| 2
|-
|9 ||align=left|Oshin Sahakian || 25||  3/7|| 42.9||  3/5|| 60||  7/8|| 87.5|| 4|| 3|| 7|| 0|| 2|| 1|| 0|| 0|| 13
|-
|10 ||align=left|Hamed Afagh || 26||  5/8|| 62.5||  3/5|| 60||  0/0|| 0|| 1|| 2|| 3|| 1|| 0|| 1|| 0|| 0|| 12
|-
|11 ||align=left|Hamed Sohrabnejad || 11||  2/4|| 50||  2/3|| 66.7||  2/3|| 66.7|| 1|| 4|| 5|| 0|| 0|| 0|| 1|| 0|| 6
|-
|12 ||align=left|Asghar Kardoust || 10||  3/3|| 100||  3/3|| 100||  0/2|| 0|| 2|| 0|| 2|| 0|| 2|| 0|| 0|| 0|| 6
|-
|13 ||align=left|Rouzbeh Arghavan || 9||  0/2|| 0||  0/1|| 0||  0/0|| 0|| 0|| 1|| 1|| 0|| 2|| 1|| 1|| 0|| 0
|-
|14 ||align=left|Samad Nikkhah Bahrami || 33||  3/11|| 27.3||  2/10|| 20||  3/5|| 60|| 0|| 1|| 1|| 8|| 4|| 3|| 2|| 0|| 10
|-
|15 ||align=left|Hamed Haddadi || 25||  5/12|| 41.7||  5/12|| 41.7||  5/7|| 71.4|| 5|| 2|| 7|| 0|| 0|| 3|| 1|| 1|| 15
|-
|align=left colspan=2|Totals || 200|| 23/59|| 39|| 20/44|| 45.5|| 21/30|| 70|| 16|| 21|| 37|| 16|| 20|| 15|| 11|| 1||70
|}

|-
|4 ||align=left|Guo Ailun || 18|| 1/4|| 25|| 1/3|| 33.3|| 1/2|| 50|| 2|| 2|| 4|| 2|| 3|| 2|| 0|| 0||3
|-
|5 ||align=left|Liu Xiaoyu || 19|| 3/4|| 75|| 3/4|| 75|| 0/0|| 0|| 0|| 0|| 0|| 2|| 5|| 2|| 1|| 0||6
|-
|6 ||align=left|Chen Jianghua || 3|| 0/1|| 0|| 0/0|| 0|| 0/0|| 0|| 0|| 0|| 0|| 0|| 1|| 1|| 0|| 0||0
|-
|7 ||align=left|Wang Shipeng || 30|| 4/10|| 40|| 1/2|| 50|| 0/2|| 0|| 0|| 3|| 3|| 0|| 2|| 6|| 1|| 0||11
|-
|8 ||align=left|Zhu Fangyu || 24|| 0/2|| 0|| 0/0|| 0|| 4/6|| 66.7|| 1|| 4|| 5|| 2|| 3|| 0|| 0|| 0||4
|-
|9 ||align=left|Sun Yue || 19|| 0/3|| 0|| 0/0|| 0|| 0/2|| 0|| 0|| 2|| 2|| 3|| 2|| 1|| 2|| 0||0
|-
|10 ||align=left|Li Xiaoxu || 21|| 3/6|| 50|| 3/6|| 50|| 0/0|| 0|| 2|| 4|| 6|| 0|| 0|| 2|| 0|| 0||6
|-
|11 ||align=left|Yi Jianlian ||colspan=16 align=left|Did not play
|-
|12 ||align=left|Zhang Bo || 5|| 0/0|| 0|| 0/0|| 0|| 0/0|| 0|| 0|| 0|| 0|| 0|| 1|| 1|| 0|| 0||0
|-
|13 ||align=left|Wang Zhelin || 20|| 3/5|| 60|| 3/5|| 60|| 0/0|| 0|| 1|| 0|| 1|| 0|| 3|| 2|| 0|| 0||6
|-
|14 ||align=left|Wang Zhizhi || 20|| 3/8|| 37.5|| 1/5|| 20|| 1/2|| 50|| 1|| 4|| 5|| 0|| 2|| 1|| 1|| 1||9
|-
|15 ||align=left|Zhou Peng || 20|| 2/3|| 66.7|| 2/2|| 100|| 2/2|| 100|| 0|| 3|| 3|| 0|| 4|| 1|| 0|| 1||6
|-
|align=left colspan=2|Totals || 200|| 19/46|| 41.3|| 14/27|| 51.9|| 8/16|| 50|| 10|| 23|| 33|| 9|| 27|| 22|| 5|| 2||51
|}

Group C
Group
2013–14 in South Korean basketball
2013–14 in Chinese basketball
2013–14 in Malaysian basketball